Kleine Ammer is a short river of Bavaria, Germany. It flows into the Ammer near Oberammergau.

See also
List of rivers of Bavaria

Rivers of Bavaria
Rivers of Germany